Tofigh Jahanbakht (9 February 1931 – 28 April 1970) was an Iranian freestyle wrestler. He won a gold medal at the 1954 World Wrestling Championships, which was Iran's first gold medal at the World Wrestling Championships, and also a bronze medal at the 1952 Olympics.

Tofigh had a hereditary liver illness, which resulted in the death of his mother and brother. He died of the same illness in London, aged 39.

References

1931 births
1970 deaths
People from Sarab, East Azerbaijan
Olympic wrestlers of Iran
Wrestlers at the 1952 Summer Olympics
Iranian male sport wrestlers
Olympic bronze medalists for Iran
Olympic medalists in wrestling
Asian Games silver medalists for Iran
Asian Games medalists in wrestling
Wrestlers at the 1958 Asian Games
World Wrestling Championships medalists
Medalists at the 1952 Summer Olympics
Medalists at the 1958 Asian Games
20th-century Iranian people
World Wrestling Champions